Payne Haas (born 2 December 1999) is an Australian professional rugby league footballer who plays as a  for the Brisbane Broncos in the NRL and Australia at international level.

He has played for the New South Wales in the State of Origin series and the Prime Minister's XIII.

Background
Haas  is of Swiss, Filipino and Samoan descent. Haas became a Muslim in early 2019 at the age of 19.

He played junior rugby league for the Woodberry Warriors, before moving to the Gold Coast, Queensland at age 13. He attended rugby league school Keebra Park State High.

Haas is the nephew of former Newcastle Knights and Cronulla-Sutherland Sharks player Mark Taufua.

Haas’s younger brother Klese Haas, plays for the Gold Coast Titans.

His mother, Uiatu "Joan" Taufua, was convicted and sentenced to nine months prison for assaulting two security guards at The Star casino in July 2022. In December that year, she was involved in a car crash that led to three deaths, after allegedly fleeing police earlier. She was subsequently charged with three counts of manslaughter and dangerous operation of a motor vehicle, evading police and driving without a driver’s licence.

Playing career

Early years
In 2016, Haas played for the Australian Schoolboys. In September 2016, he signed a 3-year contract with the Brisbane Broncos until the end of 2019, after weighing up offers from 10 NRL clubs, plus scholarship offers from American football college teams. 

In 2017, he played for the Broncos' NYC team. After impressing for the Broncos NYC side throughout the year, he was called in to act as an Andrew Fifita "clone" at a Queensland State of Origin opposed training session before game three of the 2017 series. In September 2017, he was named at prop in the NYC Team of the Year. 

Haas scored 9 tries in 18 games.

2018
In 2018, Haas played for the Broncos' Queensland Cup feeder side, Wynnum Manly Seagulls. In round 8 of the 2018 NRL season, he made his NRL debut for the Broncos against the South Sydney Rabbitohs. Commentator Phil Gould remarked that his debut game was "the birth of a superstar." He would go on to play two more games before missing the remainder of the season with an injured shoulder. In July 2018, the Broncos re-signed Haas on a 6-year contract.

2019
Haas, while fasting for his first ever Ramadan after converting to Islam in early 2019, scored the first try of his NRL career against the Sydney Roosters in round 10 on Friday 17 May 2019 at Suncorp Stadium in Brisbane.

On 26 May, Haas was selected in the New South Wales Blues Origin squad for Game 1 of the 2019 State of Origin series. This makes him the second most inexperienced player to play Origin having played only 10 NRL matches. Haas fasted for Ramadan up until the day before Game 1 of the 2019 State of Origin series on Wednesday 5 June 2019.

Haas missed out on selection for Game 2 and Game 3 of the 2019 State of Origin series which New South Wales won 2-1.

Haas made 21 appearances for Brisbane in the 2019 NRL season as the club finished 8th on the table and qualified for the finals.  Haas played in the club's elimination final against Parramatta which Brisbane lost 58-0 at the new Western Sydney Stadium.  The defeat was the worst in Brisbane's history and also the biggest finals defeat in history.

On 30 September, Haas was named at prop in the Australia PM XIII side. On 7 October, Haas was named in the Australian side for the upcoming Oceania Cup fixtures.

2020
Haas played 17 games for Brisbane in the 2020 NRL season as the club finished last on the table for the first time ever in their history.  Brisbane only managed to win only three games for the entire year out of a possible 20 matches.

2021
Haas made 20 appearances for Brisbane in the 2021 NRL season as the club missed the finals.  He played in all three games of the 2021 State of Origin series which New South Wales won 2-1.

2022
On 25 May 2022, Haas requested an immediate release from his Brisbane contract which was later rejected. In round 12 of the 2022 NRL season, Haas was jeered by Brisbane supporters every time he touched the ball during the clubs victory over the Gold Coast.
On 29 May 2022, Haas was selected by New South Wales to play in game one of the 2022 State of Origin series.

To finish up his club year, Haas was awarded Brisbane's Player of the Year award again for the fourth time in a row. He was later selected as a prop forward in the NRL team of the year at the Dally M awards.

Honours

Individual
 Brisbane Broncos U20s Best Forward: 2017
 Holden Cup Team of The Year: 2017
 Brisbane Broncos XXXX Fan Player: 2019
 Brisbane Broncos "Gary Balkin Award" Players' Player: 2019, 2020, 2021
 Brisbane Broncos "Paul Morgan Medal" Player of The Year: 2019, 2020, 2021, 2022
 Dally M Rookie of The Year: 2019
 Dally M Prop of The Year: 2019, 2021
 Brisbane Broncos "Shane Webcke Award" Best Forward: 2020, 2021, 2022
 Brisbane Broncos "Wally Lewis Award" Play of the Year: 2021 (Round 16 v Cronulla Sharks 79th min)

Representative
 2019 State of Origin series Winners
 2021 State of Origin series Winners

Rivalries
In 2020, he began a rivalry with long-time rival Tino Fa'asuamaleaui, after a fight broke out during the second State of Origin Game of the 2020 Series.

Controversy
On 19 February 2019, Haas was suspended for four matches and fined $20,000 by Brisbane after he failed to cooperate fully with the NRL integrity unit regarding an investigation into off-field incidents involving family members.

On 16 January 2021, Haas was charged with offensive language and intimidating police at Tweed Heads.  On 4 February 2021, Haas was handed a two-year good behaviour bond over the incident.  On 8 February 2021, Haas was handed a $50,000 fine by the NRL and a three-match suspension as further punishment for intimidating police.

On 3 April 2022, it was announced that Haas had been placed under investigation by the Brisbane club after video footage emerged which showed Haas being involved in a drunken fight with teammate Albert Kelly.

References

External links
Brisbane Broncos profile

1999 births
Living people
Australia national rugby league team players
Australian rugby league players
Australian people of Filipino descent
Australian people of Swiss descent
Australian sportspeople of Samoan descent
Australian Muslims
Brisbane Broncos players
Philippines national rugby league team players
Rugby league players from Newcastle, New South Wales
Rugby league props
Wynnum Manly Seagulls players
Converts to Islam